This is the discography of Swedish DJ Alesso.

Studio albums

Mixtapes

Singles

Music videos

Remixes
2010
 Tim Berg - "Alcoholic" (Alesso Taking It Back Remix)
 Deniz Koyu featuring Shena - "Time of Our Lives" (Alesso Remix)

2011
 Therese - "Drop It Like It's Hot" (Alesso Remix)
 Dúné - "Heiress of Valentina" (Alesso Remix)
 Erik Holmberg and Niko Bellotto featuring JB - "Running Up That Hill" (Alesso Remix)
 Nadia Ali, Starkillers and Alex Kenji - "Pressure" (Alesso Remix)
 Swedish House Mafia - "Save the World" (Alesso Remix)
 DEVolution - "Good Love" (Alesso Remix)
 LMFAO featuring Lauren Bennett and GoonRock - "Party Rock Anthem" (Alesso Remix)
 David Guetta featuring Sia - "Titanium" (Alesso Remix)
 Jasper Forks - "River Flows In You" (Alesso Remix)

2012
 Arty - "When I See You" (Alesso Mix)
 Keane - "Silenced by the Night" (Alesso Remix)

2013
 OneRepublic vs. Alesso - "If I Lose Myself" (Alesso Remix)

2015
 Maroon 5 vs. Alesso – "This Summer" (Alesso Remix)

2016
 Alesso - "I Wanna Know" (Alesso and Deniz Koyu Remix)
 Jolin Tsai - "Play" (Alesso Remix)

2017
 The Chainsmokers and Coldplay - "Something Just Like This" (Alesso Remix)
 J Balvin and Willy William - "Mi Gente" (Alesso Remix)

2019
 Alesso - "Time" (Alesso and Deniz Koyu Remix)
 Alesso featuring Tini - "Sad Song" (Alesso Remix)

2020
 Alesso featuring Liam Payne - "Midnight" (Alesso and Esh Remix)

2021
 Alesso and Marshmello featuring James Bay - "Chasing Stars" (VIP Mix)
 Alesso - "Somebody To Use" (Toxic Mix)

2022
 Alesso and Katy Perry - "When I'm Gone" (VIP Mix)

Productions

Notes

References

Discographies of Swedish artists
House music discographies